Cape Wood is a point marking the east extremity of Flat Island at the western entrance to Robertson Bay, Victoria Land, Antarctica. Discovered in January 1841 by Captain James Ross, Royal Navy, and named by him for Charles Wood, Esq., First Secretary to the Admiralty.

Headlands of Victoria Land
Pennell Coast